Abelia  is a previously recognized genus that contained about 30 species and hybrids, placed in the honeysuckle family, Caprifoliaceae. Molecular phylogenetic studies showed that the genus was not monophyletic, and in 2013, Maarten Christenhusz proposed the merger of Abelia (excluding section Zabelia) into Linnaea, along with some other genera. Abelia section Zabelia was raised to the genus Zabelia.

Description
Species formerly placed in Abelia are shrubs from 1–6 m tall, native to eastern Asia (Japan west to the Himalaya) and southern North America (Mexico); the species from warm climates are evergreen, and colder climate species deciduous. The leaves are opposite or in whorls of three, ovate, glossy, dark green, 1.5–8 cm long, turning purplish-bronze to red in autumn in the deciduous species. The flowers appear in the upper leaf axils and stem ends, 1-8 together in a short cyme; they are pendulous, white to pink, bell-shaped with a five-lobed corolla, 1–5 cm long, and usually scented. Flowering continues over a long and continuous period from late spring to fall.

Some of these species are cultivated as ornamental garden plants, and may still be described as Abelia in horticultural listings. A notable example is the hybrid Abelia × grandiflora  (now Linnaea × grandiflora).

Taxonomy
The generic name commemorates Clarke Abel, a keen naturalist who accompanied Lord Amherst's unsuccessful embassy to China in 1816 as a surgeon, under the sponsorship of Sir Joseph Banks. All of Abel's seeds and plants were lost in a shipwreck on the homeward voyage, however; living plants of Abelia chinensis (now Linnaea chinensis) were first imported to England in 1844 by Robert Fortune.

Some species placed in Abelia were transferred to Linnaea at various times from 1872 onwards, but these transfers were not accepted by most botanists. Molecular phylogenetic studies showed that a number of genera traditionally placed in the tribe Linnaeeae were closely related, but that Abelia was not monophyletic, even with Abelia section Zabelia split off as a separate genus Zabelia. In 2013, Maarten Christenhusz proposed that Abelia and related genera be merged into Linnaea. This proposal has been adopted by recent sources, including the Plants of the World Online.

Allergenicity

Abelia has an OPALS allergy scale rating of 5 out of 10, indicating moderate potential to cause allergic reactions, exacerbated by over-use of the same plant throughout a garden. People allergic to honeysuckle may experience cross-reactive allergic reactions with Abelia.

Symbolism
The Abelia is symbolic for equality in some parts of Mexico.

Former species and synonyms
Species and synonyms previously placed in Abelia but now placed in other genera include:

Abelia adenotricha = Lonicera elisae
Abelia aitchinsonii = unplaced
Abelia angustifolia = Zabelia angustifolia
Abelia anhweiensis = Zabelia dielsii
Abelia aschersoniana = Linnaea chinensis
Abelia biflora = Zabelia biflora
Abelia brachystemon = Zabelia brachystemon
Abelia buchwaldii = Linnaea serrata
Abelia buddleioides = Zabelia buddleioides
Abelia cavaleriei = Linnaea chinensis
Abelia chinensis = Linnaea chinensis
Abelia chowii = unplaced
Abelia coreana = Zabelia dielsii
Abelia coriacea = Linnaea coriacea
Abelia corymbosa = Zabelia corymbosa
Abelia curviflora = Linnaea spathulata
Abelia davidii = Zabelia biflora
Abelia deutziifolia = Linnaea engleriana
Abelia dielsii = Zabelia dielsii
Abelia engleriana = Linnaea engleriana
Abelia fargesii = unplaced
Abelia floribunda = Linnaea floribunda
Abelia gracilenta = Linnaea forrestii
Abelia graebneriana = Linnaea engleriana
Abelia × grandiflora = Linnaea × grandifloraAbelia grandifolia = Linnaea grandifoliaAbelia gymnocarpa = Linnaea serrataAbelia hanceana = Linnaea chinensisAbelia hersii = Zabelia dielsiiAbelia hirsuta = Linnaea floribundaAbelia insularis = Zabelia bifloraAbelia integrifolia = Zabelia integrifoliaAbelia ionandra = Linnaea chinensisAbelia ionostachya = Linnaea spathulataAbelia koehneana = Linnaea englerianaAbelia lipoensis = Linnaea chinensisAbelia longituba = Linnaea parvifoliaAbelia macrotera = Linnaea macroteraAbelia mairei = Linnaea parvifoliaAbelia mexicana = Linnaea mexicanaAbelia microphylla = Linnaea forrestiiAbelia mosanensis = Zabelia tyaihyoniiAbelia myrtilloides = Linnaea parvifoliaAbelia occidentalis = Linnaea occidentalisAbelia onkocarpa = Zabelia onkocarpaAbelia parvifolia = Linnaea parvifoliaAbelia rupestris = Linnaea chinensisAbelia sanguinea = Linnaea spathulataAbelia schischkinii = Linnaea parvifoliaAbelia schumannii = Linnaea parvifoliaAbelia serrata = Linnaea serrataAbelia shikokiana = Zabelia bifloraAbelia spathulata = Linnaea spathulataAbelia speciosa = Linnaea floribundaAbelia splendens = Lonicera fragrantissimaAbelia tereticalyx = Linnaea parvifoliaAbelia tetrasepala = Linnaea tetrasepalaAbelia tomentosa = Linnaea serrataAbelia tyaihyonii = Zabelia tyaihyoniiAbelia umbellata = Zabelia umbellataAbelia uniflora = Linnaea unifloraAbelia verticillata = Linnaea parvifoliaAbelia zanderi = Zabelia dielsii''

References and external links

Historically recognized angiosperm genera
Caprifoliaceae